Michel Petrucciani (28 December 1962 – 6 January 1999) was a French jazz pianist. From birth he had osteogenesis imperfecta, a genetic disease that causes brittle bones and, in his case, short stature. He became one of the most accomplished jazz pianists of his generation despite his health condition and relatively short life.

Biography

Early years
Michel Petrucciani came from an Italo-French family (his grandfather was from Naples) with a musical background. His father Tony played guitar, his brother Louis played bass, and his brother Philippe also plays the guitar. Michel was born with osteogenesis imperfecta, which is a genetic disease that causes brittle bones and, in his case, short stature. It is also often linked to pulmonary ailments. The disease caused his bones to fracture over 100 times before he reached adolescence and kept him in pain throughout his entire life. "I have pain all the time. I'm used to having hurt arms," he said. In Michel's early career, his father and brother occasionally carried him because he could not walk far on his own unaided. In certain respects he considered his disability an advantage, as he got rid of distractions like sports that other boys tended to become involved in. And he hints that his disability was helpful in other parts of his life. He said: "Sometimes I think someone upstairs saved me from being ordinary."

At an early age, Michel saw Duke Ellington on television and wished to become a pianist like him. When Michel was four, his father bought him a toy piano of his own, but Michel smashed the piano with a toy hammer. "When I was young, I thought the keyboard looked like teeth," he said. "It was as though it was laughing at me. You had to be strong enough to make the piano feel little. That took a lot of work." Soon after this, Michel's father bought him a real piano.

From the beginning, Petrucciani had always been musical, reportedly humming Wes Montgomery solos by the time he learned to speak. He began learning classical piano at the age of four, and was making music with his family by the age of nine. The musician who would prove most influential to Petrucciani was Bill Evans, to whom he began listening at around the age of ten. Petrucciani's layered harmonies, lyrical style, and articulation of melody have always been linked most strongly to this early exposure to Evans.

Music career in Paris
Petrucciani gave his first professional concert at the age of 13. At this point of his life, he was still quite fragile and had to be carried to and from the piano. His hands were average in length, but his size meant that he required aids to reach the piano's pedals.

Petrucciani felt he needed to travel to Paris to begin his musical career, but he found it difficult to leave home. His father was protective, constantly concerned for his son's well-being and reluctant to put him in any danger. Petrucciani's drummer Aldo Romano said of Michel's father: "[He] was an idiot. He didn't trust anybody. He wanted to keep Petrucciani as a partner, to play music with. He was very jealous. So I had to fight to take him to Paris, because his father didn't want me to, because he wanted to keep him, like you would cage a monster."

Petrucciani made his first trip to Paris at the age of fifteen. There he played with Kenny Clarke in 1977 and Clark Terry in 1978. His breakthrough performance occurred at the Cliousclat jazz festival. Terry was missing a pianist, and when Petrucciani was carried onto the stage, he thought it was a joke; Petrucciani was not more than three feet tall. But he astounded Terry and the rest of the festival with his prodigious talent and virtuosity. Terry said, "When I heard him play – oh, man! He was a dwarf, but he played like a giant. I said, 'listen, little guy – don't run away. I'll be back for you.'"

Petrucciani's trip to Paris garnered mixed experiences but was undoubtedly musically and personally transforming. He reports, "It was mostly to do with drugs and weird women, but I was lucky and got out safe." His attitude during his time in France was largely immature and insecure, despite his considerable talent. He wore a yachtsman's cap and frequently acted pushy and tough, referring to people as 'baby'. "He knew how to say 'motherfucker' in French," said Michael Zwerin, who met Petrucciani when the pianist was fifteen. Petrucciani played in a trio with Kenny Clarke during his time in Paris and rose to stardom.

After his stint in Paris, Petrucciani briefly returned to home before beginning his professional life. Living with his drummer, Romano, he was free of the protective presence of his father and began enjoying an independent lifestyle. Petrucciani began recording with Owl Records and struck up a friendship with the recording company's owner, Jean-Jacques Pussiau. Pussiau recalls that Petrucciani always seemed to be in a hurry to record, saying, "I don't want to lose time." Eventually however Petrucciani desired independence from Romano, too. Romano remembers: "He didn't feel free with me. So he had to kill his second father somehow to move on. He needed to escape. He needed to go very far, as far as he could go, and that was California."

Petrucciani travelled to the U.S. after his trip to Paris, but it is not known whether he stopped in New York first. "Michel was really into bullshitting...he would lie to your face," said French journalist Thierry Peremarti. This calls into question his strange account of his time in Manhattan. He claimed to have scammed his way into the city on bad checks and hid out in Brooklyn with the help of Sicilian family connections. He also claimed to have played piano in a midtown brothel.

With Charles Lloyd in New York
What is known for certain is that he ended up in California in 1982, where he visited retired saxophonist Charles Lloyd. Lloyd had stopped playing when people began to view his sidemen as more fashionable than he himself was. After hearing Petrucciani play, Lloyd was so inspired that he agreed to tour with him. Lloyd said to him, "I was here planning to not play again. You triggered me. I heard this beauty in you and I said, 'well I have to take you 'round the world cause there's something so beautiful, it was like providence calling." Petrucciani and Lloyd's tour of the West Coast of the United States was a huge success and they continued internationally. On 22 February 1985, with Petrucciani cradled in his arms, Lloyd walked onto the stage at Town Hall in New York City and sat him on his piano stool for what would be a historic evening in jazz history: the filming of One Night with Blue Note. The film's director John Charles Jopson would later recall in the reissued liner notes that the moment moved him to tears.

Petrucciani and Lloyd's performance at the Montreux Jazz Festival was made into an album, and in 1982, they won the 1982 Prix d'Excellence. But Petrucciani expressed mostly disdain and frustration at the awards he felt were being heaped upon him, believing that he was receiving so many at least in part because people believed he was going to die young.

Petrucciani moved to New York City in 1984 and spent the rest of his life there. This was the most productive period of his career. In 1986 he was recorded at the Montreux Jazz Festival with Wayne Shorter and Jim Hall, producing the trio album Power of Three. He also played with diverse figures in the U.S. jazz scene including Dizzy Gillespie.

But he made a priority of recording solo piano also. He said: "I really believe a pianist is not complete until he's capable of playing by himself. I started doing solo concerts in February 1993, when I asked my agent to cancel my trio dates for a year in order to play nothing but solo recitals… I had a wonderful time playing alone, and discovering the piano and really studying every night. I felt like I was learning so much about the instrument and about communicating directly with an audience. So it was an incredible experience. I really loved doing that, and afterwards getting on stage with a group again and playing with other people was a piece of cake!"

Personal life
He had five significant personal relationships: Erlinda Montano (marriage), Eugenia Morrison, Marie-Laure Roperch, the Italian pianist Gilda Buttà (the marriage lasted three months and ended in divorce) and Isabelle Mailé (with whom he shares his grave). With Marie-Laure he fathered a son, Alexandre, who inherited his genetic disorder. He also had a stepson named Rachid Roperch.

In 1994, he was granted the Order of the Légion d'honneur in Paris.

In the late 1990s, Petrucciani's lifestyle became increasingly taxing. He was performing over 100 times per year, and in 1998, the year before he died, he performed 140 times. He became too weak to use crutches and had to resort to a wheelchair. His final manager said, "He was working too much – not only recording and doing concerts, but he was always on television, and he was always doing interviews. He got himself overworked, and you could see it. He pushed too much." In his later years Petrucciani was known to drink heavily.

Petrucciani died from a pulmonary infection a week after his 36th birthday. He was interred in Le Père Lachaise Cemetery in Paris, one tomb away from Frédéric Chopin.

On 12 February 2009, the French music channel Mezzo broadcast a special event paying homage to Petrucciani close to the 10th anniversary of his death.

The first two American albums featuring Petrucciani were produced by Gabreal Franklin. The first, 100 Hearts, a solo album, was produced at the famous RCA Studio A, on the Avenue of the Americas in New York City. The second was a trio album, recorded live at Max Gordon's old Village Vanguard club in New York City. These were among the first albums to use digital recording technology, on Mitsubishi X80 recorders, so early on that the only manuals available were in Japanese; but Franklin and Tom Arrison managed to get them to function by trial and error.

In 1985 a concert at the Village Vanguard in New York was recorded on video.

Personality and musical style
Osteogenesis imperfecta seemed to contribute greatly both to Petrucciani's personality and his playing style. By his own account, he was in almost constant physical pain. Yet, he was known for his cheerful, playful, even cavalier personality. He said, "I love humor; I love to laugh, I love jokes, I love silliness. I love that; I think it's great. I think laughter is worth a whole lot of medicine."

Though he often exhibited arrogance and even womanizing tendencies in his adolescent years, the defining characteristic of Petrucciani was his confidence. Michael Zwerin recalled one example: "We were sitting there wondering what to play. It was kind of hot. And Michel said, 'anybody know "Giant Steps?" Neither Louis nor I wanted to admit we didn't really know it. So there was this great silence. And Michel said, "Well, I do!" and he pounded into a solo version of it at a very fast clip, and it was really amazing. That to me is Michel—'Well, I do!' Man, a confidence you wouldn't believe."

Petrucciani also appeared to have a quirky side. In a Mezzo documentary, he can be heard saying in a humorous voice, "I am very short!" Pussiau, the owner of Owl Records, recalled when he used to carry Michel for convenience. "Sometimes, when I used to carry him, he would bite my ear. We'd walk into a restaurant, and he'd chomp."

During his last years in New York, it seemed Michel's general attitude of carelessness was magnified. He said to his manager, "I want to have at least five women at once, I want to make a million dollars in one night." In an interview, he said: "My handicap is not mortal. I won't die because of my handicap. It has nothing to do with that." He also said, "Eventually, when I get to be 75, I'll write a book on my deathbed." Yet other reliable sources assert that he was always aware of the potential effects of osteogenesis imperfecta.

What is known for certain is that Petrucciani was fiercely determined to take all the joy and satisfaction from life that he could. "I'm a brat," he said. "My philosophy is to have a really good time and never let anything stop me from doing what I want to do. It's like driving a car, waiting for an accident. That's no way to drive a car. If you have an accident, you have an accident—c'est la vie." He certainly lived true to his maxim. Just one week before he died of a pulmonary infection, he was up all night celebrating the new year with his friends.

Stylistically, Petrucciani is most frequently compared to Bill Evans and Keith Jarrett for his lyricism and Oscar Peterson for his virtuosity. His playing was often quite dramatic; critics accuse him of over-indulgence and cheap showmanship, sometimes dismissing his music as being too accessible. Petrucciani was loose and playful in a rhythm section, and gave attention to a strong articulation of the melody. He sometimes paused at the peaks of his solo lines before descending again, as if in appreciation of his idea.

Michel distinguished himself most obviously from his primary inspiration in that he lacked Bill Evans's cerebral approach to the piano. Petrucciani's interest was primarily in simply playing; he spent little time reharmonizing or arranging. "When I play, I play with my heart and my head and my spirit… I don't play to people's heads, but to their hearts." he says. The moments of musical clarity or bliss he describes come during his performances. "You know sometimes when I play a concert… and I have that right timing… those notes make me feel warm and good… it's like lovemaking, it's like having an orgasm." Yet despite his emphasis on performance, he disliked applause, calling it old-fashioned and a distraction.

Michel's unbridled love of the piano in no way entailed artistic carelessness. Indeed, he described the piano as literally taking him to his grave. "It might lead me to death… meaning that I'd be on my deathbed saying, too bad I can't live another year, I would have been much better." He also complained about mistakes, saying, "…the pitfall is that when I make a mistake it sounds absolutely outrageous, really horrible because everything else is so clear!"

Wayne Shorter summed up Michel Petrucciani's essential character and style in this quote:

"There's a lot of people walking around, full-grown and so-called normal—they have everything that they were born with at the right leg length, arm length, and stuff like that. They're symmetrical in every way, but they live their lives like they are armless, legless, brainless, and they live their life with blame. I never heard Michel complain about anything. Michel didn't look in the mirror and complain about what he saw. Michel was a great musician—a great musician—and great, ultimately, because he was a great human being because he had the ability to feel and give to others of that feeling, and he gave to others through his music."

Discography

As leader 

 Flash (Bingow, 1980)
 Michel Petrucciani (Owl, 1981)
 Date with Time (Celluloid, 1981)
 Estate (IRD, 1982)
 Darn that Dream (Celluloid, 1982)
 Toot Sweet with Lee Konitz (Owl, 1982) – live
 Oracle's Destiny (Owl, 1983) – recorded in 1982
 100 Hearts (Concord/The George Wein Collection, 1984) – recorded in 1983
 Note'n Notes (Owl, 1984)
 Live at the Village Vanguard (Concord, 1985) – live recorded in 1984
 Cold Blues (Owl, 1985)
 Pianism (Blue Note, 1986) – recorded in 1985
 Power of Three with Wayne Shorter and Jim Hall (Blue Note, 1987) – live recorded in 1986
 Michel plays Petrucciani (Blue Note, 1988) – recorded in 1987
 Music (Blue Note, 1989)
 The Manhattan Project with Wayne Shorter, Stanley Clarke, Lenny White, Gil Goldstein and Pete Levin (Blue Note, 1990)
 Playground (Blue Note, 1991)
 Live (Blue Note, 1991) – live
 Promenade with Duke (Blue Note, 1992)
 Conversation with Tony Petrucciani (Dreyfus, 1992)
 Marvellous (Dreyfus, 1994)
 Conference De Presse with Eddy Louiss (Dreyfus, 1994)
 Au Theatre Des Champs-Élysées (Dreyfus, 1994) – live
 Flamingo with Stéphane Grappelli (Dreyfus, 1996) – recorded in 1995
 Michel Petrucciani (Dreyfus, 1996)
 Both Worlds (Dreyfus, 1997)
 Solo Live in Germany (Dreyfus, 1998) – live recorded in 1997
Posthumous releases
 Trio in Tokyo with Steve Gadd and Anthony Jackson (Dreyfus, 1999) – live recorded in 1997
 Conversations With Michel with Bob Malach (Go Jazz, 2000) – recorded in 1988–89
 Dreyfus Night in Paris with Marcus Miller, Biréli Lagrène, Kenny Garrett and Lenny White (Dreyfus, 2004) – live recorded in 1994
 Piano Solo - The Complete Concert In Germany (Dreyfus, 2007) – live recorded in 1997
 Michel Petrucciani & NHOP (Live) (Dreyfus, 2009)[2CD] – live recorded in 1994
 Both Worlds Live North Sea Jazz Festival (Dreyfus, 2016)[2CD + DVD-Video] – live at North Sea Jazz Festival plus bonus CD including live at Montreux Jazz Festival
 One Night In Karlsruhe (Jazzhaus, 2019) – live recorded in 1988
 Solo in Denmark (Storyville Records, 2022)  –  live recorded on June 23, 1990, at the Silkeborg Riverboat Jazz Festival in Denmark

Compilation 
 The Complete Recordings Of Michel Petrucciani: The Blue Note Years 1986-1994 (Blue Note, 1998)
 Concerts Inedits (Dreyfus, 1999)[3CD]
 Days of Wine and Roses: 1981-1985 (Owl, 2000)[2CD]
 So What: Best of Michel Petrucciani (Dreyfus, 2004)

As sideman 
With Steve Grossman
 Quartet (Dreyfus Jazz, 1999) – recorded in 1998

With Charles Lloyd
 Montreux 82 (Elektra Musician, 1983) – live recorded in 1982 at Montreux Jazz Festival
 A Night in Copenhagen (Blue Note, 1985) – live recorded in 1983
 One Night with Blue Note Volume 4 (Blue Note, 1985) – live

With Joe Lovano
 From the Soul (Blue Note, 1992) – recorded in 1991

Tributes
A mosaic of a piano by Édouard Detmer in his honor was included on the Place Michel-Petrucciani in the 18th district of Paris.
Michel recorded a piano solo on "Why Do You Do Things Like That?" on Patrick Rondat's On the Edge, which was released the same year as Petrucciani's death. Patrick Rondat dedicated this album to him.
"Waltz For Michel Petrucciani", a song on the Finnish jazz Trio Töykeät's album Kudos, is dedicated to him.
Christian Jacob's album Contradictions does his interpretation of eleven of Petrucciani's compositions as a kind of tribute.
"Simply Marvellous (Celebrating the Music of Michel Petrucciani)" is a Jazz album released in 2012 by Tommaso Starace featuring nine of Petrucciani's most celebrated compositions.
"To Mike P.", a composition by the Italian jazz pianist Nico Marziliano, is dedicated to him.

See also
French jazz

References

Further reading
Michel Petrucciani (2011) by pianist and musicologist Benjamin Halay by Editions Didier Carpentier (prefaced by Didier Lockwood and Alexandre Petrucciani).

External links

Michel Petrucciani at the National Jazz Archive
Michel Petrucciani interview in Jazz Magazine (in French)
Michel Petrucciani documentary "Mezzo", with interviews, on YouTube

1962 births
1999 deaths
People from Orange, Vaucluse
Entertainers with dwarfism
French jazz pianists
French male pianists
French people of Italian descent
Burials at Père Lachaise Cemetery
People with osteogenesis imperfecta
20th-century pianists
20th-century French musicians
20th-century French male musicians
French male jazz musicians